Calderonism or Calderonismo is a political and ideological doctrine of Costa Rica, which emerged in the 1940s under the leadership of caudillo Dr. Rafael Ángel Calderón Guardia, before, during and after he was president with his National Republican Party, and which was continued by various political forces such as Unity Coalition, National Unification Party and the current Social Christian Unity Party and its split the Social Christian Republican Party. It is together with Liberacionismo one of the two traditional political tendencies of Costa Rican politics, with which it represented a certain type of Costa Rican bipartisanship from 1986 to 2002 and revolves around the Calderón family. It is a form of populist and Catholic Christian socialism very similar to Argentine Peronism.

History

Calderonism was born with the political leadership of Dr. Rafael Ángel Calderón Guardia. His administration (1940-1944) has been traditionally controversial, during his tenure the University of Costa Rica was created, the border problem with Panama was solved through the Echandi-Fernández treaty and in alliance with the Catholic Church and the Costa Rican Communist Party, the Labor Code and the Social Guarantees were promulgated. However accusations of authoritarianism, voters' fraud, corruption and persecution of political opponents and ethnic minorities (particularly Germans, Italians and Japanese after the Pearl Harbor attacks with Costa Rican joining World War II as part of the Allies) stained Calderon's rule.

Calderón directly from 1940 to 1944, his chosen candidate, Teodoro Picado Michalski won the 1944 Costa Rican general election as part of a Republican-Communist coalition named Victory Bloc and in the middle of increasing political tensions.

In the 1948 election Calderón was again candidate for the presidency. The National Electoral Court provisionally declared the opposition candidate Otilio Ulate Blanco provisionally elected, but Calderón Guardia filed a fraud and presented to Congress a nullity of the presidential elections, although not of the legislative ones, in which his supporters had obtained a majority. On March 1, 1948, Congress -where the alliance of Calderonists and communists had a majority-, annulled the presidential elections. This caused a civil war, in which the government forces were defeated militarily by those of rebel caudillo José Figueres Ferrer. Calderón went into exile in Nicaragua, and in December 1948 he invaded Costa Rica with support from the government of Nicaraguan dictator Anastasio Somoza García, but the expedition - known as the counterrevolution - failed. Calderón moved with his family to Mexico, and in 1955 he undertook a second invasion of Costa Rica, with the support of Somoza García, Rafael Leónidas Trujillo and Marcos Pérez Jiménez, but his forces were defeated. The rebel forces seized the border town of Villa Quesada on 12 January.

With the Republicans and Communist outlawed the Constituent Assembly of Costa Rica was convened in 1949 enabling the current Costa Rican Constitution. Figueres (who rule de facto for 18 months before giving power to Ulate in 1949) was a formal candidate by the newly formed National Liberation Party winning the 1953 Costa Rican general election. Calderón's called for abstention. In 1958 the presidential candidate for the National Union Party, Mario Echandi, promised to bring back Calderón and family from exile and sign a general amnesty if elected and received the vote in bloc of the Calderonistas.

Calderón was candidate to Congress in exile and won a seat as deputy returning in 1958 thanks the Echandi's amnesty. He was a presidential candidate again in 1962, and despite his defeat, until his death he continued to be a very influential political figure. He was Ambassador of Costa Rica in Mexico from 1966 to 1969 and was declared Benemerito de la Patria (benefactor of the homeland, the greatest honor confer to nationals in Costa Rica) by the Legislative Assembly of Costa Rica, on April 17, 1974, by agreement No. 1410.

In the 1978 election, Rodrigo Carazo Odio was elected president with the support of Calderonism under the banner of a coalition of parties called Unity Coalition, formed by the Calderonist Republican Party, the Christian Democratic Party, the Democratic Renewal Party and the Popular Union Party. But by 1981 when the struggles for the election of the candidate for the 1982 elections begin, problems arise between the candidate Rafael Ángel Calderón Fournier of the Calderonista Republican Party and Rodolfo Méndez Mata, mostly represented by the Democratic Renewal Party. Shortly after, and also with the support of the Democratic Renewal Party, Rodrigo Madrigal Nieto tried to register his candidacy. In these circumstances of struggle of tendencies the Calderonista Republican, Popular Union and Christian Democratic parties decided to go alone to the election and changed the flag of the coalition for another with the colors red and blue (the modern colors of PUSC). However, at the end of August 1981, Democratic Renewal returns to the Coalition and takes part on it. The conditions of the campaign are unfavorable as the party has to bear the unpopularity of the Carazo's government. Knowing that he has no chance of winning, Calderón Fournier campaigns focus on saving the coalition and the future party. The results support is 34% of the votes but remains as second most voted force, considered a success given the circumstances.

In April 1983 the Political Directory of the coalition adopted a calendar and it was immediately agreed that the Popular Union Party would serve as the receiver of the other three, changing its name to that of Social Christian Unity Party. The National Assemblies of each party participating in said coalition had to agree, in advance, its dissolution to immediately give way to the merger. Legally this implied that as long as the new party existed, none of the merged parties could re-register. On December 17, 1983, at the last session of the National Assemblies of the parties that formed the Unity Coalition, they agreed to dissolve and merge into one. In 1984 they begin the steps for the election of the candidate for the 1986 elections. Rafael Ángel Calderón Fournier and Óscar Aguilar Bulgarelli register as pre-candidates, however, at the beginning of the campaign, Bulgarelli drops the race. With only one pre-candidate left, the convention is suspended and on December 2, 1984, Rafael Ángel Calderón Fournier was elected as presidential candidate.

On February 2, 1986 the electoral result favored the rival National Liberation Party's nominee, Oscar Arias Sánchez by a difference of 6.5%, however PUSC managed to elect 25 deputies while its presidential candidate had received 45.8% of the valid votes making clear the existence of a two-party system.

In 1987 work began for a new participation in the elections, this time with more experience. Miguel Ángel Rodríguez began his political career as a candidate, as did Germán Serrano Pinto. Due to the defeats suffered in the previous elections, in 1982 and 1986, Calderón Fournier had retired from an eventual candidacy, and supported Rodriguez. However, the bases expect a new candidacy from Calderón. Polls begin to show strong support for Calderón. In December 1987, Serrano decides to withdraw his candidacy and seeks an agreement with Rodríguez. Meanwhile, there had been clashes between Rodriguez and Calderón for the list of candidates for deputies, which causes many leaders to begin to support Calderón's candidacy. Shortly after a movement is generated, which starts mainly from the PUSC deputies, to formally request Rafael Ángel Calderón Fournier to be a candidate for the presidency again. After two consecutive periods of the PLN in power, and demonstrated the strength of the PUSC in the 1986 elections, the prospects for winning the elections in 1990 were very favorable. Under these circumstances, and under the support of party deputies, Rafael Ángel Calderón announces his candidacy. Rodriguez decides to continue in the fight. As expected. Rafael Ángel Calderón Fournier won the candidacy for 76% of the votes cast.

In the elections of February 4, 1990, Calderón was elected president with 46.2% of the votes over his liberationist opponent Carlos Manuel Castillo. In this election, 29 deputies were also elected. Not only the presidency was reached but also the majority in the Legislative Assembly and a victory in the seven provinces of the country. The 1990 triumph confirmed the progress, already glimpsed in 1986, towards a bipartisan system. Thus, the party consolidated in the 1990s, for the 1994 election Miguel Ángel Rodríguez is launched as a presidential candidate unopposed, which he loses to PLN's candidate by a small margin of 1.8%. However, he won in the 1998 election. Rodriguez began to suffer from low popularity due to his association with neoliberal ideas, which unleashed strikes against the government. Despite this the figure of Dr. Abel Pacheco de la Espriella emerges, who with the charisma he had won for several years working on television, and due to his position as deputy of the Legislative Assembly of Costa Rica, is named presidential candidate for the 2002 election winning the election and making PUSC won for the first time twice in a road.

Shaken by corruption scandals, The scandals even caused Calderón and Rodríguez to be arrested, prosecuted and in Calderón's case condemned, the unpopularity of the Pacheco administration and the resurgence of the new Citizens' Action Party the party suffered a terrible debacle and its candidate in 2006, Ricardo Toledo Carranza, obtained only 3% of the votes. After Calderón's conviction for corruption on October 5, 2009, he withdrew his presidential candidacy being replaced by the then deputy of the party Luis Fishman Zonzinski, who obtained a low electoral support, again, of 3%.

The candidate endorsed by the Calderonism for the primary elections of the 2013 Social Christian Unity Party, Dr. Rodolfo Hernández Gómez, won the national convention with 77% of the votes over the liberal rival Rodolfo Piza. However, Hernández would resign his candidacy despite strong support in the polls following major disagreements with the party leadership, and the candidacy would be assumed by Piza.

In 2015 Calderón and his followers left the party and founded a new one called Social Christian Republican Party (an allusion to Calderón's father historical party). Nevertheless, PUSC saw a victory in the 2016 municipal election gaining second place in municipal votes surpassing ruling PAC and receiving much more votes than Calderón's new party. PUSC obtained 15 mayors (second in number after PLN) and saw an increase in its electoral support, unlike PLN that although the more voted party did saw a decrease in support.

In 2018 Piza both Piza and Hernández were nominees but from different parties; Piza from PUSC and Hernández from PRSC attaining fourth and sixth place respectively and supporting opposite candidates in the second round. Piza would support PAC's candidate Carlos Alvarado Quesada who won the election on second round and would take the office of Prime Minister during Alvarado's first year of tenure.

References

Eponymous political ideologies
Political history of Costa Rica
Political movements in Costa Rica